CBS Schoolbreak Special is an American anthology series for teenagers that aired on CBS from December 1978 to January 1996. The series began under the title CBS Afternoon Playhouse, and was changed during the 1984–85 season. The concept was similar to ABC's Afterschool Special.

List of specials

Afternoon Playhouse specials
Under its original name, the Afternoon Playhouse aired a handful of made-for-TV films, the most notable of which was the 1983 release of Revenge of the Nerd. The TV special was often mistaken for the film of a similar name which premiered one year later in 1984.

Season 1 (1978)

Season 2 (1979–80)

Season 3 (1981)

Season 4 (1981–82)

Season 5 (1982–83)

Schoolbreak Specials

Season 1 (January 24 – June 12, 1984)

Season 2 (October 16, 1984 – April 23, 1985)

Season 3 (October 22, 1985 – April 1, 1986)

Season 4 (September 10, 1986 – June 21, 1987)

Season 5 (October 20, 1987 – April 19, 1988)

Season 6 (October 18, 1988 – April 11, 1989)

Season 7 (October 17, 1989 – April 24, 1990)

Season 8 (October 16, 1990 – April 2, 1991)

Season 9 (October 22, 1991 – April 7, 1992)

Season 10 (October 20, 1992 – April 13, 1993)

Season 11 (October 12, 1993 – April 12, 1994)

Season 12 (October 11, 1994 – May 30, 1995)

Season 13 (October 24, 1995 – January 23, 1996)

See also 
 ABC Afterschool Special
 Special Treat
 After school special

References

External links
 
 

1980 American television series debuts
1996 American television series endings
1980s American teen television series
1990s American teen television series
1980s American anthology television series
1990s American anthology television series
CBS original programming
English-language television shows
Television series about teenagers